TeamCity is a build management and continuous integration server from JetBrains. It was first released on October 2, 2006 and is commercial software and licensed under a proprietary license: a freemium license for up to 100 build configurations and three free Build Agent licenses are available. Open Source projects may request a free license.

Notable features
Gated commits (prevents developers from breaking sources in a version control system by running the build remotely for local changes prior to commit)
Build Grid. Allows running multiple builds and tests under different platforms and environments simultaneously
Integrated code coverage, inspections and duplicates search
Integration with IDEs: Eclipse, IntelliJ IDEA, Visual Studio 
Platforms supported: Java, .NET and Ruby

Supported version control systems
TeamCity supports the following version control systems:
Git
Mercurial (hg)
Subversion (svn)
Perforce
Concurrent Versions System (CVS)
StarTeam
ClearCase (Base and UCM)
Team Foundation Version Control (TFVC)
Plastic SCM
Visual SourceSafe (VSS)
Vault

See also
 Continuous Integration software
 Comparison of continuous integration software

References

External links
 

Compiling tools
Continuous integration